Liurana is a genus of frogs in the family Ceratobatrachidae. It is the only genus in the subfamily Liuraninae.

Species
The following species are recognised in the genus Liurana:

Liurana alpina Huang and Ye, 1997
Liurana medogensis Fei, Ye, and Huang, 1997
Liurana vallecula Jiang, Wang, Wang, Li, and Che, 2019
Liurana xizangensis (Hu, 1977)

References

 
Ceratobatrachidae
Amphibians of China
Amphibian genera